Zee Sarthak (formerly Sarthak TV) is an Indian general entertainment pay television channel broadcasting in Odia language. It is owned by Zee Entertainment Enterprises. It broadcasts Odia programming, such as family dramas, comedies, reality shows, crime shows and telefilms. It was initially Sarthak TV and owned by Sitaram Agrawal since 2010. In 2015, it was taken over by Zee Entertainment Enterprises.

Current programming

Fiction series

Dubbed series

Non-fiction shows

Former programming

Fiction series

Remake series

Dubbed series

Reality shows

Channels

See also
List of Odia-language television channels
List of longest-running Indian television series

References

External links

Television stations in Odisha
Zee Entertainment Enterprises
Television stations in Bhubaneswar
Odia-language television channels
Companies based in Bhubaneswar
Television channels and stations established in 2010
2010 establishments in Orissa